Narotam Satyanarayan Sekhsaria is an Indian industrialists and philanthropist.

Early life 
Born in ChirawaRajasthan, India in a traditional Marwari trading family in 1950, he was brought up in Bombay and was educated as a chemical engineer from the city's prestigious University Department of Chemical Technology (UDCT), now known as Institute of Chemical Technology, Mumbai.

Career 
He started his career at his family business, predominantly trading cotton. He subsequently switched career in the early 1980s, giving up trading to set up Ambuja Cements. Over the next decade, Mr Seksharia built Ambuja Cements into one of the world's most efficient, profitable, and greenest cement companies. It was among the earliest companies in India to develop its own captive sea-ports and use sea transportation to ship cement across the country and abroad. Ambuja Cements went on to acquire a stake in ACC Limited, then India's best known and geographically speaking, the largest cement company. In 2005, Mr Sekhsaria, then still in his 50s, did something unthinkable among family-controlled businesses in India. He divested his interest in Ambuja Cements and ACC Ltd. and ceded control to Holcim Group, the Swiss multinational cement giant. Mr Sekhsaria continues to be the non-executive chairman of Ambuja Cements and ACC Limited.   

Mr Sekhsaria is the chairman of Ambuja Cement Foundation, which he set up as part of Ambuja in the early 1990s and has since grown to become one of India's most extensive corporate CSR programs. It does work in the areas of rural development through agriculture, health, education, skill-building and women's empowerment initiatives.

He is also the Chairman of the Narotam Sekhsaria Foundation, the philanthropic arm of his family office, which funds and supports individuals and organisations working in health, education, livelihoods, governance, art and culture.

Publication: The Ambuja Story 
Publisher: HarperCollins

References

External links 
 

Businesspeople from Mumbai
Rajasthani people
Indian businesspeople in cement
Year of birth missing (living people)
Indian philanthropists
Indian art collectors
Engineers from Maharashtra
Institute of Chemical Technology alumni
Living people